Mission: Impossible: Music from and Inspired by the Motion Picture is the official soundtrack for the 1996 film Mission: Impossible. The soundtrack was a success, peaking at No. 16 on the Billboard 200 and spawning the top-10 hit "Theme from Mission: Impossible" by U2 members Adam Clayton and Larry Mullen, Jr.

"Theme from Mission: Impossible" was certified gold by the Recording Industry Association of America for sales of 500,000 copies on July 2, 1996, while the soundtrack reached gold status just two weeks later on July 16.

Track listing 
 "Theme from Mission: Impossible" – Larry Mullen & Adam Clayton (3:27)
 "Spying Glass" – Massive Attack (5:21)
 "I Spy" – Pulp (5:56)
 "Impossible Mission" – Danny Elfman (5:35)
 "Headphones" – Björk (5:40)
 "Weak" – Skunk Anansie (3:31)
 "On and On" – Longpigs (4:11)
 "Claire" – Danny Elfman (2:55)
 "Dreams" (Radio Edit) - The Cranberries (4:13)
 "You, Me and World War III" ('Big' Single Remix) - Gavin Friday (4:28) 
 "So" – Salt (3:33)
 "Trouble" – Danny Elfman (3:32)
 "No Government" – Nicolette (5:31)
 "Alright" – Cast (3:35)
 "Mission: Impossible Theme (Mission Accomplished)" – Adam Clayton & Larry Mullen (3:05)

Note: Only five of the fifteen tracks on the album (Clayton & Mullen's first rendition of Lalo Schifrin's theme music, the contribution of The Cranberries and the three Danny Elfman score suites) are actually heard in the movie.

Charts

Weekly charts

Year-end charts

Certifications

References

1996 soundtrack albums
Mission: Impossible music
Action film soundtracks
Mission: Impossible (film series)